Roman Razbeyko (born 9 March 1973) is a Russian track and field athlete. He competed in the men's decathlon at the 2000 Summer Olympics.

References

1973 births
Living people
Sportspeople from Rostov-on-Don
Russian decathletes
Olympic decathletes
Olympic athletes of Russia
Athletes (track and field) at the 2000 Summer Olympics
Russian Athletics Championships winners